The men's hammer throw event at the 1959 Summer Universiade was held at the Stadio Comunale di Torino in Turin on 3 and 4 September 1959.

Medalists

Results

Qualification

Final

References

Athletics at the 1959 Summer Universiade
1959